The List of shipwrecks in 1766 includes some ships sunk, wrecked or otherwise lost during 1766.

January

16 January

25 January

Unknown date

February

11 February

14 February

16 February

20 February

21 February

Unknown date

March

18 March

22 March

24 March

Unknown date

April

12 April

29 April

Unknown date

May

9 May

Unknown date

June

12 June

13 June

21 June

26 June

Unknown date

July

21 July

22 July

Unknown date

August

10 August

14 August

22 August

24 August

25 August

September

6 September

10 September

11 September

15 September

18 September

30 September

Unknown date

October

6 October

16 October

17 October

24 October

25 October

27 October

Unknown date

November

17 November

18 November

28 November

Unknown date

December

6 December

7 December

10 December

11 December

18 December

28 December

Unknown date

Unknown date

References

1766